Patricia Dorothy Douglas (March 5, 1917 – November 11, 2003) was a dancer and movie extra. Douglas was the subject of the documentary Girl 27, documenting her 1937 rape by Metro-Goldwyn-Mayer salesman David Ross and the aftermath. Douglas was one of the first people to come forward after experiencing sexual assault in the film industry, leading to a massive scandal that MGM minimized by a smear campaign against Douglas.

Douglas retired from the industry after her sexual assault, but appeared on camera 65 years after her assault after being contacted by biographer David Stenn who learned about her while uncovering the story of the 1937 assault and cover up.

Early life and career 
Douglas was born on March 5, 1917, to Mildred Mitchell in Kansas City, Missouri. At some point later, the mother and daughter moved to Los Angeles, California to pursue work in the film industry.  Douglas dropped out of school at the age of 14 and focused on pursuing a film career, working as a dancer and extra, and appearing in films such as Gold Diggers of 1933 and So This Is Africa.

1937 sexual assault
On the evening of May 5, 1937, a 20-year-old Douglas was brought to work at an MGM party with more than 120 other young women, most of them dancers. The young women were hired to work that night under the premise that they would be working on a film. At the party, Douglas was targeted by Ross and was forced to drink. When she ran outside to vomit, Ross followed her, dragged her into a car in a nearby field, and raped her.  

After the assault, a parking attendant heard Douglas screaming and saw her staggering as Ross ran away. Douglas was brought to Culver City Community hospital where she was douched before being examined by a doctor.

The resulting scandal was one of the largest Hollywood had ever faced at the time. Douglas was the first woman to take on a film studio for sexual assault. The district attorney for the case was Buron Fitts, who has been accused of taking bribes from MGM. When Douglas' case was ignored, she went to attorney William J. F. Brown who pushed for his client's case and ask for them to investigate the complaint or they would go to the media. The resulting newspaper article gave Douglas' identity, photo, and home address.

The trial dominated the news cycle, taking attention over stories such as the marriage of the abdicated Edward VIII and Wallis Simpson and the death of actress Jean Harlow. MGM's response to this was to create a smear campaign against Douglas, tarnishing her reputation and framing her as immoral and promiscuous. The case was later dismissed for want of prosecution.

Later life 
Douglas retired from the industry after her assault and struggled with her relationships in life as a result of the mental and emotional trauma she experienced from the rape and  subsequent smear campaign by MGM. Douglas was married three times and gave birth to one daughter, Patricia (Patti) Minter. Douglas passed away of an unknown illness on November 11, 2003, in Las Vegas, Nevada.

Legacy 
More than 60 years after Douglas' assault, it was documented in the film Girl 27 by David Stenn. Her speaking out against her rapist has been reevaluated with the emergence of the Me Too movement. Actresses such as Jessica Chastain and Rose McGowan have praised the film and the telling of Douglas's story.

References 

1917 births
2003 deaths
American actresses
21st-century American women